Djurgårdens IF Fotboll is a Swedish professional football club based in Stockholm.

The list encompasses the major honours won by Djurgården, records set by the club, their managers and their players.

Honours

Domestic
 Swedish Champions
 Winners (12): 1912, 1915, 1917, 1920, 1954–1955, 1959, 1964, 1966, 2002, 2003, 2005, 2019

League
 Allsvenskan:
 Winners (8): 1954–1955, 1959, 1964, 1966, 2002, 2003, 2005, 2019
 Runners-up (4): 1962, 1967, 2001, 2022
 Superettan:
 Winners (1): 2000
 Division 1 Norra:
 Winners (3): 1987, 1994, 1998
 Runners-up (1): 1997
 Svenska Serien:
 Runners-up (1): 1911–1912

Cups
 Svenska Cupen:
 Winners (5): 1989–1990, 2002, 2004, 2005, 2017-2018
 Runners-up (4): 1951, 1974–1975, 1988–1989, 2013
 Svenska Mästerskapet:
 Winners (4): 1912, 1915, 1917, 1920
 Runners-up (7): 1904, 1906, 1909, 1910, 1913, 1916, 1919
 Allsvenskan play-offs:
 Runners-up (1): 1988
 Corinthian Bowl:
 Winners (1): 1910
 Runners-up (2): 1908, 1911
 Rosenska Pokalen:
 Runners-up (2): 1902
 Wicanderska Välgörenhetsskölden:
 Winners (4): 1907, 1910, 1913, 1915
 Runners-up (3): 1908, 1914, 1916

Doubles
2002: League and Svenska Cupen
2005: League and Svenska Cupen

Player records

Appearances
 Most appearances in all competitions: Gösta Sandberg, 328
 Most league appearances: Gösta Sandberg, 322
 Most Allsvenskan appearances: Sven Lindman, 312
 Most cup appearances: Andreas Johansson, 30
 Most continental appearances: Haris Radetinac, 17
 Youngest first-team player: Isak Alemayehu Mulugeta –  (against Mjällby AIF, Allsvenskan, 6 November 2022)
 Oldest first-team player: Björn Alkeby –  (against Ope IF, Division 1 Norra, 29 August 1993)
 Most consecutive appearances: Sven Lindman, 175 (1970–1977)
 Most separate spells with the club:

Most appearances
Competitive matches only, includes appearances as substitute. Numbers in brackets indicate goals scored.

Goalscorers
 Most goals in all competitions: Gösta Sandberg, 79
 Most league goals: Gösta Sandberg, 77
 Most Allsvenskan goals: Gösta Sandberg, 70
 Most cup goals: Andreas Johansson, 16
 Most continental goals: Fredrik Dahlström and Kaj Eskelinen, both 5
 Most goals in a season: Leif Skiöld, 30 goals (in the 1961 season)
 Most league goals in a season: Leif Skiöld, 27 goals (in the 1961 season)
 Most goals in a single match: Leif Skiöld, 6 goals (against IFK Eskilstuna, Division 2 Svealand, 23 September 1961)
 Youngest goalscorer: Roger Lindevall –  (against AIK, Allsvenskan, 2 June 1977)
 Youngest hat-trick scorer: 
 Oldest goalscorer: Sven Lindman –  (against IFK Norrköping, Allsvenskan, 11 June 1980)

Top goalscorers
Competitive matches only. Numbers in brackets indicate appearances made.

International

 First capped players: Ivar Friberg, Erik Lavass, Samuel Lindqvist, and Bertil Nordenskjöld for Sweden v. Norway (11 September 1910)
 Most capped Djurgården player for Sweden while playing for the club: Gösta Sandberg, 52 caps whilst an Djurgården player
 First player to play in a World Cup: Hasse Jeppson for Sweden v. Italy (25 June 1950)
 First player to play in a World Cup final: Sigge Parling for Sweden v. Brazil (29 June 1958)
 First player to play in a European Championship: Andreas Isaksson for Sweden v. Bulgaria (14 June 2004)
 First player to play in an Olympic tournament: Ragnar Wicksell for Sweden v. Netherlands (29 June 1912)

Top Ten Transfers

Record transfer fees paid

Record transfer fees received

Managerial records

 First full-time manager: 
 Longest-serving manager: Einar Svensson – 9 years (1935 to 1944)

Club records

Matches

Firsts
 First match: AIK 2–1 Djurgården, Stockholm Idrottsförbunds Tävlingar, 16 July 1899
 First match at Tranebergs IP: Djurgården 3–1 AIK, Svenska Serien, 1 October 1911
 First Allsvenskan match: Djurgården 3–2 Stattena IF, 31 July 1927
 First match at Stockholm Olympic Stadium: 
 First match at Råsunda Stadium: 
 First Svenska Cupen match: IF Verdandi 2–3 Djurgården, 14 June 1942
 First European match: Djurgården 0–0 Gwardia Warszawa, European Cup, 20 September 1955
 First match at Tele2 Arena: Djurgården 1–2 IFK Norrköping, Allsvenskan, 21 July 2013

Record wins
 Record win:
13–0 (against Norrmalms IK, Svenska Bollspelsförbundets serie, 14 September 1902)
14–1 (against Delsbo IF, Svenska Cupen, 22 August 1996)
 Record league win: 11–1 (against IFK Eskilstuna, Division 2 Svealand, 23 September 1961, against IFK Sunne, Division 2 Svealand, 1 October 1961)
 Record Allsvenskan win: 9–1 (against Hammarby IF, Allsvenskan, 13 August 1990)
 Record Svenska Cupen win: 14–1 (against Delsbo IF, 22 August 1996)
 Record European win: 8–0 (against Apollon Limassol, UEFA Intertoto Cup, 29 June 1996)
 Record away win: 14–1 (against Delsbo IF, Svenska Cupen, 22 August 1996)

Record defeats
 Record defeat: 1–11 (against IFK Norrköping, Allsvenskan, 14 October 1945)
 Record league defeat: 1–11 (against IFK Norrköping, 14 October 1945)
 Record Svenska Cupen defeat: 1–6 (against AIK, 3 July 1949)
 Record European defeat: 0–6 (against SC Levski Sofia, European Cup, 1965–66)
 Record home defeat:
 Record away defeat: 1–11 (against IFK Norrköping, Allsvenskan, 14 October 1945)

Record consecutive results
 Most consecutive wins overall: 14 (24 July 2000 to 8 October 2000)
 Most consecutive league wins: 12 (13 September 1948 to 29 May 1949)
 Most consecutive wins in Allsvenskan: 7 (7 October 2002 to 21 April 2003)
 Most consecutive wins coming from behind: 
 Most consecutive draws: 5 (two times: 20 May 1965 to 9 June 1965, 8 May 2012 to 23 May 2012)
 Most consecutive losses overall: 
 Most consecutive league losses: 6 (three times: 18 April to 14 May 1937, 18 June to 17 August 1986, 11 July to 17 August 2009)
 Most consecutive matches unbeaten: 19 (6 June 1948 to 29 May 1949)
 Most consecutive matches unbeaten in the league: 19 (6 June 1948 to 29 May 1949)
 Most consecutive matches unbeaten in Allsvenskan: 17 (19 April to 6 September 1959)

Goals
 Most league goals scored in a season: 77 in 22 matches, Division 2 Svealand, 1961
 Fewest league goals scored in a season: 3 in 6 matches, Fyrkantsserien, 1918
 Most league goals conceded in a season: 66 in 22 matches, Allsvenskan, 1927–28
 Fewest league goals conceded in a season: 1 in 6 matches, Serien, 1902

Points
 Most points in a league season:
 Two points for a win: 42 (in 33 matches in 1957–58, Allsvenskan)
 Three points for a win: 63 (in 30 matches in 2000, Superettan)
 Fewest points in a league season:
 Two points for a win: 2 (in 6 matches in 1918, Svenska Serien)
 Three points for a win: 24 (in 26 matches in 1999, Allsvenskan)

Attendances
Only competitive first-team matches are considered.
 Highest home attendance: 48,894 (against IFK Göteborg, Allsvenskan, 11 October 1959) at Råsunda Stadium
 Highest attendance at Stockholm Olympic Stadium: 21,995 (against AIK, Allsvenskan, 16 August 1946)
 Lowest attendance at Stockholm Olympic Stadium: 0 (against Halmstads BK, Allsvenskan, 15 September 1996; against Helsingborgs IF, Allsvenskan, 21 March 2010)
 Highest attendance at Tele2 Arena: 27,798 (against IFK Norrköping, Allsvenskan, 21 July 2013)
 Lowest attendance at Tele2 Arena: 2,798 (against Halmstads BK, Svenska Cupen, 16 March 2014)

European statistics

Footnotes

References

Djurgardens IF
Records